Sports drinks, also known as electrolyte drinks, are functional beverages whose stated purpose is to help athletes replace water, electrolytes, and energy before, during and especially after training or competition. There are many perceived benefits and questions pertaining to the efficacy of use for sports and fitness performance.

At times if used too much, in wrong cases (as most of nutritional items) they may hinder health or performance. The drinks, or some of their ingredients such as sugar, may not be suitable for certain conditions.

Categories of sport drinks
Sports drinks can be split into three major types:
Isotonic sport drinks contain similar concentrations of salt and sugar as in the human body.
Hypertonic sport drinks contain a higher concentration of salt and sugar than the human body.
Hypotonic sport drinks contain a lower concentration of salt and sugar than the human body.
Most sports drinks are approximately isotonic, having between 4 and 5 heaped teaspoons of sugar per eight ounce (13 and 19 grams per 250ml) serving.

Purpose and effectiveness

Athletes that are actively training lose water and electrolytes from their bodies by sweating, and expending energy. Sports drinks are considered to be a solution for this problem through fluid replacement, carbohydrate loading and nutrient supplementation.

It is perceived that sodium present in sports drinks might help to avoid Hyponatremia (low sodium in the blood), however, many studies counter this by demonstrating that this is not the case. Many studies claim that the consumption of an electrolyte containing sports drink does not protect against this condition.

A stated purpose of sports drinks, which provide many calories of energy from sugars, is to improve performance and endurance. The potential benefits of sports drinks depends upon other factors including the quantity of the beverage ingested, the time if takes for the drink to be emptied from ones body, absorption time, and the carbohydrate type.

Potentially harmful effects  
Some potentially harmful health effects of drinking sports drinks without prolonged exercise include weight gain, diabetes and dental erosion. These drinks are high in calories and sugar which thereby can contribute towards an unhealthy diet. Generally, sports drinks contain two-thirds the amount of sugar found in a normal soda. The sugar found in sports drinks still exceeds the recommended amount of sugar in a day for a child.

Sports drinks also contain high amount of caffeine among other dietary supplements. Often the concentration of caffeine is higher than found in soft drinks. In moderate amounts, caffeine is not harmful and can provide various benefits regarding endurance however, in large amounts this can have adverse effects. Although these drinks contain various different dietary supplements, health studies have claimed that there is a lack of thorough labelling which means that consumers may not always be aware of what they are consuming.

History
In the 19th and early 20th centuries, athletes occasionally drank beer of low alcohol content to replenish water, minerals and energy in the body. As the water is boiled during the brewing process and thus sterilized, the beer was a safer option than water from an unknown source. However, studies suggest that even a low dose of ethanol decreases endurance performance: it inhibits liver glucose output during exercise, and also impairs psychomotor skills such as reaction time, hand-eye coordination and balance.

Since the first modern Olympics, fluid intake during sports have varied a lot due to a lack of consensus in the scientific community pertaining to the use of sports drinks. In the early 1900s there was a widespread belief that consumption of fluids such as water during exercise was unnecessary. However, with the advancement of exercise physiology in 1923, the cardiovascular model of thermoregulation was researched by A.V. Hill. Based on this model, the consequences of water loss and the significance of fluid consumption was emphasized.

Energy and sports drinks first appeared in Europe and Asia in the 1960s as a response to demands for dietary supplements that would increase energy. Taisho Pharmaceuticals, a Japanese company, introduced Lipovitan D, one of the first sports/energy drinks on the market in 1961. Since then, sports drinks have developed into a multibillion dollar market.

Commercial market 
The sports and energy drinks market is rapidly growing around the world. Sports drinks are included within the functional drinks market. Within the functional drinks category, sports and energy drinks account for the largest volume growth. These drinks have experienced exponential growth of more than 240% in the United States of America and around the world from the years 2004 to 2009.

There have been a variety of different types of drinks introduced to the market over the years and a lot of these drinks are targeted towards young athletes.

Examples of sports drinks
Commercially available sports drinks include:

 100plus
 10-K Thirst Quencher
 Accelerade
 All Sport
 Aquarius
 Bodyarmor
 Herbalife 
 Isostar
 Lucozade Sport
 Muscle Milk
 Pocari Sweat
 Powerade
 Prime
 Sqwincher
 Gatorade
 Vemma Thirst
 Vitamin Water

See also

Dehydration
Energy drink
Energy gel
Gainer (supplement)
Hyperthermia
Oral rehydration therapy

References

 
Dietary supplements
Non-alcoholic drinks
Drinks